The 1973–74 DDR-Oberliga was the 25th season of the DDR-Oberliga, the first tier of league football in East Germany.

The league was contested by fourteen teams. 1. FC Magdeburg won the championship, the club's second of three East German championships. During the season Magdeburg also won the 1973–74 European Cup Winners' Cup.

Hans-Bert Matoul of 1. FC Lokomotive Leipzig was the league's top scorer with 20 goals, while Bernd Bransch of FC Carl Zeiss Jena won the seasons East German Footballer of the year award.

On the strength of the 1973–74 title Magdeburg qualified for the 1974–75 European Cup where the club was knocked out by Bundesliga champions FC Bayern Munich in the second round. It was the second time the East and West German champions were drawn against each other in an UEFA competition, Bayern having eliminated Dynamo Dresden in the previous season in the same competition. Second-placed club FC Carl Zeiss Jena qualified for the 1974–75 European Cup Winners' Cup as the seasons FDGB-Pokal winners and was knocked out by Benfica in the second round. Third-placed Dynamo Dresden qualified for the 1974–75 UEFA Cup where it was knocked out in the third round by Hamburger SV while fourth-placed FC Vorwärts Frankfurt lost to Juventus in the first round.

Table
The 1973–74 season saw two newly promoted clubs BSG Stahl Riesa and BSG Energie Cottbus.

Results

References

Sources

External links
 Das Deutsche Fussball Archiv  Historic German league tables

1973-74
1
Ober